Mateusz Radecki (born 2 April 1993) is a Polish professional footballer who plays as a midfielder for GKS Tychy.

Senior career
Radecki's youth career started at Młodzik 18 Radom, before moving to Widzew Łódź in 2008. For the 2011–12 season, Radecki was loaned to the Radomiak Radom youth team. In 2012, after a successful loan spell, the move was made permanent and Radecki signed his first professional contract. Radecki's career started well with Radomiak, making a claim for a starting position. The 2014–15 season was fraught with injury, and he only managed three appearances in the cup. Despite being out for a full season, Radecki signed a new contract with Radomiak. 

In 2016, Radecki signed a two-year contract with Wigry Suwałki, this move saw Radecki playing in I liga for the first time in his career, having previously only played in the third tier with Radomiak. After his contract ran out with Wigry, Radecki joined Śląsk Wrocław signing a two-year contract. Radecki scored his first goal for Śląsk in the 5–0 away win over Miedź Legnica.

On 22 September 2020, he returned to Radomiak Radom.

On 19 July 2022, he moved to I liga side GKS Tychy as a free agent on a two-year contract.

Honours

Club
Radomiak Radom
I liga: 2020–21

References

External links

1993 births
People from Radom
Sportspeople from Masovian Voivodeship
Living people
Polish footballers
Association football midfielders
Radomiak Radom players
Wigry Suwałki players
Śląsk Wrocław players
GKS Tychy players
Ekstraklasa players
I liga players
II liga players
III liga players